Ohinewai or Ōhinewai is a small settlement in the Waikato Region, in New Zealand. It is located on the east bank of the Waikato River on SH1, 9 km north of Huntly

The name  is Māori for "girl's water place" (o = place of, hine = girl, wai = water), or, more likely, "place of Hinewai", Hinewai being a female personal name.

In July 2019, bed manufacturer Comfort Group announced its intention to create an affordable housing estate in Ohinewai. It has purchased 176ha of land with the intention of developing 1100 homes.

Marae

The local marae, Matahuru Papakainga, is a traditional meeting ground for the Waikato Tainui hapū of Ngāti Makirangi, Ngāti Mahuta and Ngāti Naho, and the Ngāpuhi hapū of Ngāti Hine.

In October 2020, the Government committed $2,584,751 from the Provincial Growth Fund to upgrade the marae and 7 other Waikato Tainui marae, creating 40 jobs.

Education

See also 
Ohinewai railway station

References

Populated places in Waikato
Waikato District
Populated places on the Waikato River